Lokanga may refer to:

Several dissimilar or unrelated Malagasy musical instruments:
Lokanga bara, a three-string fiddle
Lonkago voatavo, a stick zither attached to a gourd